Expedition 52 (June - September 2017) was the 52nd expedition to the International Space Station. It officially began on June 2, 2017 10:47 UTC, with the undocking of Soyuz MS-03. Transfer of Command from Expedition 51 was done on June 1, 2017.

Due to a decision to cut down the number of participating Russian cosmonauts in 2017, only two crew members were launched on Soyuz MS-04, which brought the ISS total crew down to five people. However, it was later decided that Peggy Whitson would stay on board longer, transferring from Expedition 51 to maintain a full crew of six astronauts over the summer, after the arrival of three new members on Soyuz MS-05. Expedition 51 officially ended on September 2, 2017 11:47 UTC, with the undocking of Soyuz MS-04.

Crew

Mission Highlights

June 2017 - Expedition 52 Begins 
NASA astronaut Peggy Whitson handed over command of the International Space Station to Russian cosmonaut Fyodor Yurchikin in a traditional Change of Command ceremony, which began at 15:50 UTC on June 1.

Expedition 51 Duo Undocked and Landed 
After spending 194 day aboard the International Space Station, Expedition 51 crew members Oleg Novitskiy of Roscosmos and Thomas Pesquet undocked from the station at 10:47 UTC, officially marking the start of Expedition 52.  Novitskiy and Pesquet landed their Soyuz MS-03 spacecraft in Kazakhstan at 14:10 UTC on June 2nd.

Supply Ship Swap 
On June 3rd, a SpaceX Falcon 9 lifted off with a Dragon resupply ship as part of SpaceX mission CRS-11 from Cape Canaveral pad 39A with supplies and a new Roll Out Solar Array (ROSA) prototype.  Jack Fischer undocked the Cygus OA-7 dubbed "SS John Glenn" from the station on June 4 to make room for the Dragon resupply.  Fischer and Whitson grappled the Dragon cargo craft on June 5 with the Canadarm2 and docked it on the Earth-facing side of the Harmony module on the Pirs docking compartment.  The Roscosmos Progress MS-06 launched from the Baikonur Cosmodrome on June 14, carrying more than 3 tons of supplies.  The Progress MS-06 docked on June 16 to the aft port of Zvezda.

June Research 
Fischer and Whitson performed observations of mold and bacteria samples for student-led biology experiments and protein crystal sample experiments. Whitson cared for rodents in the Rodent Habitat Facility to understand healing mechanisms and the efficiency of osteoinductive drugs in low gravity and performed experiments for a cardiac stem cell study to understand the effects of microgravity on the aging process.  Fischer and Whitson set up a seedling growth botany study to investigate the effects of light and microgravity on Arabidopsis thaliana. Fisher was also the subject of a Vascular Echo study that examined changes in blood vessels and the heart while in space and their recovery back on Earth.  Yurchikhin studied pain sensation in space to help researches develop proposals to improve health care in orbit.  Yurchikhin, Whitson and Fischer also took body measurements for the in-flight conditions that could be compared to pre- and post-flight conditions.  Whitson started a cancer study to evaluate antibody-drug conjugates, which can increase the effectiveness of chemotherapy while reducing its side effects.

July 2017 - Full Crew After Soyuz MS-05

Dragon CRS-11 Departs 
Fischer and Whitson released the SpaceX Dragon CRS-11 on July 3 at 6:41 UTC.

July Research 
Whitson tested her ability to work on interactive tasks as part of a Fine Motor Skills study to measure how motor skills are affected by long-term microgravity exposure, different phases of adaptation and recovery after returning to Earth. Fischer finished operations with a Group Combustion Module experiment, where droplets of decane were arranged on a thin-fiber lattice so that the flame and temperature distribution could be measured as the flame spreads.  Whitson and Fischer also collected their own blood, urine and saliva samples for the Fluid Shifts experiment that measured how much fluid shifts from the lower body to the upper body in microgravity and the effects on the human eye. Whitson started the Mag3D experiment that magnetizes cells to make them easier to handle in microgravity.  Whitson also setup gear for a Two Phase Flow experiment that studied interfacial behaviors of perfluorohexane, an electronic coolant, under different conditions.  Fischer used the exercise bike to research the effectiveness of high intensity, low volume exercise, which showed that maximum intensity exercise appears better for aerobic capacity than normal intensity exercise in microgravity.

Station Maintenance 
Fyodor Yurchikhin maintained the life support system on the Russian side of the station by preplacing pumps and hoses and re-pressurizing the cabin.  Jack Fischer replaced a failed water separator inside the Tranquility module  that was part of the Common Cabin Air Assembly that controls the stations humidity and temperature.  Fischer also installed new equipment in the Window Observational Research Facility (WORF).

New Crew 

On July 28, the Soyuz MS-05 launched from Baikonur Cosmodrome in Kazakhstan with Randy Bresnik of NASA, Sergey Ryazanskiy of Roscosmos and Italian Paolo Nespoli of ESA.  They docked later that day while both spacecraft were over Germany.

August 2017 - Research and Resupply

August Research 
Nespoli and Bresnik recorded their experiences with space headaches, researches later concluded that changes in cerebral blood flow and intracranial pressure caused them, opposed to the theory that it was space motion sickness.  Fischer and Whitson studied a new drugs effects on mouse bone atrophy, current therapies cannot restore lost bone, but the new drug from the University of California at Los Angeles had the potential to rebuild bone and block further bone loss.

SpaceX Delivered Supplies 
On August 16, Fischer and Nespoli captured the SpaceX CRS-12 Dragon using the station's robotic arm and installed it on the station's Harmony module.  The Dragon delivered more than 6,400 pounds of supplies including an ice cream treat for the astronauts.

Spacewalk 
Yurchikhin and Ryazankiy exited the Pirs Docking Compartment on August 17th.  They manually deployed 5 nanosatellites and collected test containers from various locations outside the Russian segment of the space station.

September 2017 - Mission Close Out 
Peggy Whitson, Jack Fischer and Fyodor Yurchikhin touched down on September 3 at 1:21 UTC southeast of Dzhezkazgan in Kazakhstan, in their Soyuz MS-04 capsule.  Whitson completed a 288-day mission, her third long duration mission which brought her career total to 665 days in space, a new record for U.S. and 8th on the all time list of days in space.  Fischer and Yurchikin completed 136 days in space, giving Yurchikin a total of 673 days in space, placing him 7th of all time at that time.

Spacewalks

Uncrewed spaceflights to the ISS
Resupply missions that visited the International Space Station during Expedition 52:

References

Expeditions to the International Space Station
2017 in spaceflight